Bring You Back is the debut album by American country music artist Brett Eldredge. It was released on August 6, 2013 by Atlantic Nashville. The album was originally titled One Way Ticket, and was to include Eldredge's second single "It Ain't Gotta Be Love". However, the album was renamed before release and "It Ain't Gotta Be Love" was scrapped from the final track listing. The album includes the singles "Raymond", "Don't Ya", "Beat of the Music" and "Mean to Me". "Don't Ya", "Beat of the Music" and "Mean to Me" reached number one on the Country Airplay chart. The album has gained critical acclaim by music critics.

Songs
Brett Eldredge stated that the last song "Go On Without Me" was written in memoriam about Lindsay Nicole Walleman, the Manager of Midwest/Northeast Promotions, W.A.R. Team at Warner Music Nashville, after she died of cancer in 2013. In addition, Eldredge noted that Walleman was "'one of the people who were fighting for me to get on the radio'", and he told that "'When the label heard this song, they agreed that we were finishing the album with it.'"

Critical reception

Bring You Back garnered critical acclaim from the six music critics to review the album. At Allmusic, Stephen Thomas Erlewine highlighted that the release is "crisp, chipper, and eager to please, an album that cheerfully checks off every box on contemporary country radio." In addition, Erlewine noted that "everything" contained on the effort "is shiny, happy country-pop -- even the ballads feel bright -- but that's the appeal of Eldredge and his debut: everybody involved worked hard to deliver a piece of gleaming modern country product, and it's hard to resist all that impeccable craft." Giving it a "B+", Bob Paxman of Country Weekly described Eldredge's voice as "soulful", comparing his delivery on "Waited Too Long" and the title track favorably to Travis Tritt. He wrote that some of the songs "travel down the often-trod pavement of small-town odes[…]But never do they sound contrived or overly sentimental". However, he called "On and On" and "Beat of the Music" "ordinary".

Markos Papadatos of Digital Journal told that everyone of the "songs on here are flawless and they each have their own identities", which they are "
not overdone or overproduced", and the tracks are "well-written and sung from the heart." Additionally, Papadatos stated that "if a baseball analogy were used to describe the excellence of this album, it is safe to say that Brett has hit a grand slam with 'Bring You Back.'" Got Country Online's Donna Block noted that "just as his music covers many genres, the songs on his album will touch a wide range of emotions." At Roughstock, Dan MacIntosh felt that "maybe it's this album's overall sonic warmth that makes it feel undeniably Country, even without many of the more obvious aural clues." Billy Dukes of Taste of Country found that "the pace is exhilarating, but also worth noting are the subtle warbles and variations in his voice that make each song on 'Bring You Back' a unique moment."

Track listing

Personnel
 Walt Aldridge – acoustic guitar 
 Steve Brewster – drums 
 Mike Brignardello – bass guitar 
 Stephanie Chapman – background vocals 
 Perry Coleman – background vocals 
 Ross Copperman – accordion , acoustic guitar , electric guitar , mandolin , programming 
 Brad Crisler – Hammond B-3 organ , piano 
 Chris DeStefano – bass guitar , drums , fiddle , banjitar , acoustic guitar , electric guitar  mandolin , background vocals 
 Dan Dugmore – acoustic guitar , electric guitar , pedal steel guitar 
 Stuart Duncan – fiddle 
 Mike Durham – acoustic guitar , electric guitar 
 Brett Eldredge – lead vocals , background vocals 
 Fred Eltringham – drums 
 Shawn Fichter – drums 
 Shannon Forrest – drums 
 Paul Franklin – pedal steel guitar 
 Byron Gallimore – electric guitar 
 Tommy Harden – drums 
 Tony Harrell – Hammond B-3 organ , piano 
 Natalie Hemby – background vocals 
 Wes Hightower – background vocals 
 Mark Hill – bass guitar 
 Charlie Judge – keyboards , piano , synthesizer strings 
 Jeff King – electric guitar 
 Luke Laird – acoustic guitar , electric guitar 
 Troy Lancaster – electric guitar 
 Jason Lehning – electric guitar , Hammond B-3 organ , piano , synthesizer 
 Rachel Loy – bass guitar 
 Tony Lucido – bass guitar 
 Chris McHugh – percussion 
 Brent Mason – electric guitar 
 Heather Morgan – background vocals 
 Craig Nelson – bass guitar 
 Jimmy Nichols – piano , synthesizer strings 
 Josh Osborne – acoustic guitar , electric guitar , mandolin 
 Russ Pahl – pedal steel guitar 
 Alison Prestwood – bass guitar 
 Matt Stanfield – keyboards 
 Bryan Sutton – acoustic guitar 
 Ilya Toshinsky – acoustic guitar , gut string guitar 
 Jason Webb – keyboards

Chart positions
The album debuted at No. 11 on the Billboard 200 and No. 2 on the Top Country Albums chart, with 21,000 copies sold in the U.S. in its debut week. It was the best start by a new male artist on Top Country Albums in nearly a year.  The album has sold 183,000 copies in the U.S. as of June 2015.

Weekly charts

Year-end charts

Singles

Certifications

References

2013 albums
Brett Eldredge albums
Atlantic Records albums
Albums produced by Byron Gallimore
Albums produced by Scott Hendricks